Radionucleotide may refer to:
 In experimental biochemistry, a nucleotide that is radiolabeled with a radionuclide such as phosphorus-32
 When used in clinical medical literature, usually an error for the intended term radionuclide